Continental Aerospace Technologies is an aircraft engine manufacturer located at the Brookley Aeroplex in Mobile, Alabama, United States. It was originally spun off from automobile engine manufacturer Continental Motors Company in 1929 and owned by Teledyne Technologies from 1969 until December 2010. The company is now part of Aviation Industry Corporation of China (AVIC), which is a Government of the People's Republic of China state-owned aerospace company headquartered in Beijing.

Although Continental is most well known for its engines for light aircraft, it was also contracted to produce the air-cooled V-12 AV-1790-5B gasoline engine for the U.S. Army's M47 Patton tank and the diesel AVDS-1790-2A and its derivatives for the M48, M60 Patton, and Merkava main battle tanks. The company also produced engines for various independent manufacturers of automobiles, tractors, and stationary equipment (pumps, generators, and machinery drives) from the 1920s to the 1960s.

History

In 1929, the company introduced its first aircraft engine, a seven-cylinder radial designated as the A-70, with a displacement of 543.91 cu in (8.91L) that produced . In August 1929, the Continental Motors Company formed the Continental Aircraft Engine Company as a subsidiary to develop and produce its aircraft engines.

As the Great Depression unwound, 1930 saw the company introduce the  A-40 four-cylinder engine. A follow-on design, the  A-50 was introduced in 1938 and was used to power the Taylor Cub and derivative Piper Cub. As the Second World War started in 1939 Continental commenced building aircraft engines for use in British and American tanks. Continental ranked 38th among United States corporations in the value of wartime production contracts.

During the late 1930s, early 1940s the Gray Marine Motor Company adapted Continental engines for maritime use. On 14 June 1944 the company was purchased by Continental for US$2.6 million. John W. Mulford, the son of one of Gray's founders was appointed general manager of Gray by Continental. Gray's continued to make marine engines in the post-war period until its closure by Continental in about 1967.

During the 1950s, the A-65 was developed into the more powerful  C-90 and eventually into the  O-200. The O-200 powered a very important airplane design milestone: the Cessna 150. By the 1960s turbocharging and fuel injection arrived in general aviation and the company's IO-520 series came to dominate the market.

In 1965, Ryan Aeronautical acquired a 50% stake in Continental Motors.

In 1969, Teledyne Incorporated acquired Continental Motors, which became Teledyne Continental Motors (TCM). That same year, the Continental Tiara series of high output engines were introduced, although they were dropped from the line after 1978. The company brought the TSIO-520-BE for the Piper PA-46 to market in 1984 and it set new efficiency standards for light aircraft piston engines. Powered by a liquid-cooled version of the IO-240, the Rutan Voyager was the first piston-powered aircraft to circumnavigate the world without refueling in 1986.

NASA selected Continental to develop and produce GAP in 1997, a new  piston engine to operate on Jet-A fuel. This was in response to 100-octane aviation gasoline becoming less available as a result of decreased demand, due to smaller turboprop engines becoming more prevalent.

In 2008, Teledyne Continental's new president, Rhett Ross announced that the company was very concerned about future availability of 100LL avgas and as a result would develop a diesel engine in the  range for certification in 2009 or 2010. By the fall of 2009 the company was feeling the effects of the economic situation and the resulting reduced demand for aircraft engines. The company announced that it would close its plant for two one-week periods in October 2009 and January 2010. Salaried employees would move to a four-day work week with one week vacations for Thanksgiving and Christmas, with the aim "to protect as much of our valuable employee base as possible".

On December 14, 2010, Continental's parent Teledyne announced that Teledyne Continental Motors, Teledyne Mattituck Services, and its general aviation piston engine business would be sold to Technify Motor (USA) Ltd, a subsidiary of AVIC International, for US$186 million in cash. AVIC is a Chinese state-owned aerospace company. In May 2011, the transaction was reported as complete and the company renamed Continental Motors, Inc.

On 23 July 2013 the company bought diesel aircraft engine manufacturer Thielert from bankruptcy for an undisclosed sum. Thielert will become an operating division of Continental and will be renamed Technify Motors GmbH.

In 2015, Continental purchased Danbury Aerospace, which included ECi (Engine Components International) and PMA (Precision Machined Airparts). ECi had been supplying aftermarket engine parts since 1943; the merger reduced third-party manufacturers of Continental engine rebuild parts. ECi's Titan engines were modern non-certified engines competing with Lycoming's Thunderbolt. These were eventually rebranded as the Continental Titan.

In March 2019 the company name was changed from Continental Motors, Inc. to Continental Aerospace Technologies.

In March 2022, Karen Hong was named as the company's president and CEO, replacing Robert Stoppek. Hong had previously served as the interim CEO and chief financial officer (CFO).

Products

Opposed piston engines

Radial and Inverted-V engines

Turboprop/turboshafts

Jet engines

See also

 Lycoming Engines
 Rotax

References

Notes

Bibliography

External links

Companies based in Mobile, Alabama
Aircraft engine manufacturers of the United States
Manufacturing companies established in 1929
American companies established in 1929
1929 establishments in Alabama
Continental aircraft engines
Manufacturing companies based in Alabama